The 2014–15 UMBC Retrievers women's basketball team will represent the University of Maryland, Baltimore County in the America East Conference. The Retrievers were led by thirteenth year head coach Phil Stern and will once again play their home games in the Retriever Activities Center. They finished the season 12–19, 6–10 in America East play for a seventh-place finish. They advance to the semifinals of the 2015 America East women's basketball tournament which they lost to Albany.

Media
All non-televised home games and conference road games will stream on either ESPN3 or AmericaEast.tv. Most road games will stream on the opponents website. Select games will be broadcast on the radio on WQLL-1370 AM.

Roster

Schedule

|-
!colspan=12 style="background:#000000; color:#FFC20F;"| Regular season

|-
!colspan=12 style="background:#FFC20F; color:#000000;"| 2015 America East tournament

See also
2014–15 UMBC Retrievers men's basketball team
UMBC Retrievers women's basketball

References

UMBC
UMBC Retrievers women's basketball seasons
UMBC
UMBC